is a Japanese manga series written and illustrated by Mai Nishikata about a tomboyish girl and her childhood friend who take piano lessons together. It was first serialized in the Japanese semi-monthly shōjo manga magazine Hana to Yume published by Hakusensha.

It is licensed in North America by CMX Manga.

Plot
Venus Capriccio is about Takami and Akira who are childhood friends who attends the same piano classes. Compared to the rough and boyish Takami, Akira is more feminine and cute and is also more skilled in piano. Takami also thinks of Akira as a younger sister, but one day Akira suddenly kisses Takami, and says he likes her…?!

Characters

Main Characters

Takami is a 17-year-old high schooler. She was brought up in a family of four brothers, causing her to become somewhat boyish. At 10 years old, she was forced to take piano lessons by her mother in order to keep her masculine personality at bay. She didn't like lessons at first because she felt embarrassed by the fact she didn't know how to play.

It wasn't until after she met Akira that she saw that playing the piano could be fun.  She didn't realize that Akira had feelings for her, and even viewed him as a younger sister... until he kissed her.

Takami met Akira at a piano lesson. Though he is two years younger, 3rd year in middle school as well as a talented pianist. He has numerous first place trophies from piano competitions.  In addition, he just has to hear a song in order to play it.

He has bright blue eyes, striking blond hair and an effeminate personality. Because of this, Takami has always thought of him as a little sister; a big problem considering the fact that he likes her. Akira routinely plays the piano for Takami. Sometimes, he does it to cheer her up; other times, he plays her favorite songs from the radio.

Supporting Characters

Media

Manga
The manga is written and illustrated by Mai Nishikata, and published by Hakusensha in the Japanese semi-monthly shōjo manga magazine, Hana to Yume between 2006 and 2008. The 29 chapters have been collected in five tankōbon volumes.

In English, Venus Capriccio is licensed by CMX who published the first volume in 2009. With the imprint's impending shutdown, CMX will only publish up to the fourth volume of the series. The fate of the fifth and final volume is unknown.

References

External links
 
 Comics worth readind vol. 1 review
 Mania.com vol. 1 review
 Comics village vol. 1 review
  

CMX (comics) titles
Hakusensha manga
Romance anime and manga